Fleming v Securities Commission [1995] 2 NZLR 514 is a cited case in New Zealand regarding negligent cases against the government.

Background
Between 1987 and 1988, finance company Star Investments, placed adverts for deposits in 2 Taranaki newspapers. These adverts were illegal under the Securities Act on numerous grounds. A concerned local solicitor contacted the Securities Commission, and they commenced an investigation, resulting in the Commission advising both the company and the newspaper to cease advertising of the securities.

Despite this, the advertisements continued, until the company later collapsed.

Three of the investors sued both the securities Commission and the newspaper

Held
The court of appeal rejected their claim.

References

Court of Appeal of New Zealand cases
New Zealand tort case law
1995 in case law
1995 in New Zealand law